ISKCON New Vedic Cultural Center (NVCC), Sri Sri Radha Vrindavanchandra temple or ISKCON Pune is a Gaudiya Vaishnavism temple situated in Pune, India. The temple is dedicated to Hindu god Radha Krishna and was opened in 2013. It is the largest temple in the city of Pune.

History

The temple complex is built on 6 acres and it took seven years for construction. It took 40 Crore rupees to construct the temple funded by the Iskcon temple in Camp and devotees. The temple was inaugurated by President Pranab Mukherjee in 2013.

Structure

The temple complex has two temples- the main Radha Krishna temple and the Venkateswara (Balaji) temple. The Radhakrishna temple is built in North Indian architecture style using red stone and marble while the Venkateswara temple is built in South Indian architecture style (Similar to Balaji temple in Tirumala) using Kota stone.

The temple offers daily classes on Bhagwad Gita and Srimad Bhagavatam.

Gallery

See also
ISKCON Temple Bangalore
Hare Krishna Golden Temple

References

External Links 

International Society for Krishna Consciousness temples
Radha Krishna temples
Hindu temples in Pune
21st-century Hindu temples